Ceroplesis hauseri is a species of beetle in the family Cerambycidae. It was described by Hintz in 1910. It is known from Tanzania, Malawi, and Uganda. It contains the varietas Ceroplesis hauseri var. conjuncta.

References

hauseri
Beetles described in 1910